James Robert Hall (born 6 October 1995) is an English artistic gymnast. A member of the English and British Senior teams since 2014, he has best known as an all-around and team gymnast, having won all-around bronze and team gold and silver in the European Artistic Gymnastic Championships and two team golds and an individual all-round silver in the Commonwealth Games. His signature piece is horizontal bar, in which he has won silver at the 2022 Commonwealth Games

Personal life
Hall was born 6 October 1995 in Bankstown, New South Wales, Australia. His family moved to Kent, England in 1997.

He began gymnastics at age six after a coach encouraged him to so do.

In 2018, Hall became an ambassador for the Young Lives Foundation, a charity that helps disadvantaged youth in Kent, England.

Career

2015 
Hall was the alternate for the silver medal winning GB team at the 2015 Glasgow world championships.

2017 
Hall won the all-around bronze medal at the 2017 European Artistic Gymnastics Championships in April 2017, held in Cluj-Napoca, Romania.

2018 
At the 2018 Commonwealth Games, Hall was part of the team that won gold in the team event. He also won silver on the individual all-around competition as well as horizontal bar, both behind Nile Wilson.

At the 2018 European Championships in Glasgow, Hall won a silver as part of the team.

2019 
In March 2019, Hall won the All-Around title at the British Championships.

He also competed at the European Championships in Szczecin, Poland, as well as the World Championships in Stuttgart, Germany.

2021 
At the 2020 Summer Olympics in Tokyo, Japan, Hall competed for Great Britain. The team took fourth place with a score of 255.76.

He also competed in the all around final where he finished in 8th position, one place ahead of teammate Joe Fraser.

2022 
At the 2022 Commonwealth Games in Birmingham, Hall was again part of the England team that won gold in the team event.  Despite sustaining an ankle injury during the competition, Hall also won silver in the individual all-around behind compatriot Jake Jarman.

References

External links 
 James Hall at British Gymnastics
 
 
 
 
 
 

1995 births
British male artistic gymnasts
Sportspeople from Maidstone
Living people
Gymnasts at the 2018 Commonwealth Games
Commonwealth Games medallists in gymnastics
Commonwealth Games gold medallists for England
Commonwealth Games silver medallists for England
Gymnasts at the 2020 Summer Olympics
Olympic gymnasts of Great Britain
Gymnasts at the 2022 Commonwealth Games
European champions in gymnastics
Medallists at the 2018 Commonwealth Games
Medallists at the 2022 Commonwealth Games